Njoku is a surname of Igbo origin. It may refer to:

 People
Augustine Njoku Obi, Nigerian professor and researcher
David Njoku, American football player
Eni Njoku, Nigerian educator and botanist
Eni G. Njoku, Nigerian-American scientist
Gideon Njoku, Nigerian footballer and coach
Jacob Njoku, Nigerian footballer
Jason Njoku, British-Nigerian businessman
Jude Njoku, Nigerian professor
Kingsley Njoku, Nigerian footballer
Mary Njoku, Nigerian actress
Ndave David Njoku, Nigerian film director and producer
Nkiru Njoku, Nigerian screenwriter and producer
Nnenna Njoku, Nigerian athlete
Philip Njoku, Nigerian footballer
Placid Njoku, Nigerian politician
Raymond Njoku, Nigerian politician
Ugo Njoku, Nigerian footballer
William Njoku, Ghanaian-Canadian basketball player

 Mythological Figures
Ahia Njoku, goddess in Igbo mythology
Njoku Ji, Igbo yam deity

Other
Elephant Path: Njaia Njoku, 2018 Central African documentary film